Welcome Stranger is a 1947 film directed by Elliott Nugent and starring Bing Crosby, Barry Fitzgerald, and Joan Caulfield. It was filmed in Hollywood with location shots at Munz Lakes during March to May 1946. Elliott Nugent appeared in one scene as a doctor sent to examine Barry Fitzgerald and that scene was directed by Billy Wilder.

Plot
Crusty Dr. McRory (Barry Fitzgerald) of Fallbridge, Maine, hires a replacement for his vacation sight unseen. Alas, he and young singing doctor Jim Pearson (Bing Crosby) don't hit it off, but Pearson is delighted to stay, once he meets teacher Trudy Mason (Joan Caulfield). The locals, taking their cue from McRory, cold-shoulder Pearson, especially Trudy's stuffy fiancée. But then, guess who needs an emergency appendectomy.

Cast
Bing Crosby as Dr. James 'Jim' Pearson 
Joan Caulfield as Trudy Mason
Barry Fitzgerald as Dr. Joseph McRory
Wanda Hendrix as Emily Walters
Frank Faylen as Bill Walters
Elizabeth Patterson as Mrs. Gilley
Robert Shayne as Roy Chesley
Percy Kilbride as Nat Dorkas
Clarence Muse as Clarence
Elliott Nugent as Dr. White

Release and reception
The film was given the biggest advertising campaign for a Paramount film since For Whom the Bell Tolls. The New York premiere was held on August 6, 1947 at the Paramount and in its initial release period in the United States, the film took in $6.1 million in rentals, making it the highest-grossing film released in the United States during 1947. The reviewer for Variety had seen the film at the Los Angeles tradeshow in April and commented: "Welcome Stranger should find the boxoffice path easy treading. It's crammed with all the ingredients that make for popular entertainment. . . Crosby and Fitzgerald take obvious pleasure in their friendly antagonist roles as young and old doctors... The New York Times felt that that film did not compare favorably with the previous Crosby / Fitzgerald success Going My Way. However they considered that both men "tower over the script through sheer personality, and especially is this true in Mr. Crosby's case, for Mr. Sheekman has not invested the character of Jim Pearson with much substance. Mr. Fitzgerald's Doc McRory is a more rounded individual, and he does have some quaintly flavorsome dialogue—"blatherskite" is one of his less endearing terms for the young assistant. Joan Caulfield is lovely and competent as the teacher...

Soundtrack
"Smile Right Back at the Sun"
"Country Style (Square Dance)"
"My Heart Is a Hobo"
" As Long As I'm Dreaming"

All of the songs were written by Jimmy Van Heusen (music) and Johnny Burke (lyrics) and sung by Bing Crosby. Burke and Van Heusen also wrote "Smack in the Middle of Maine" for the film but it was not used.

Crosby recorded all of the songs for Decca Records and these were issued on a 2-disc, 78 rpm album titled "Selections from Welcome Stranger". The songs were also included in the Bing's Hollywood series.

References

External links

1947 films
1947 comedy films
American black-and-white films
American comedy films
Films directed by Elliott Nugent
Films produced by Sol C. Siegel
Films scored by Robert Emmett Dolan
Films set in Maine
Medical-themed films
Paramount Pictures films
1940s American films